White lung  or white lung syndrome may refer to:
 Acute respiratory distress syndrome
 Asbestosis
 Pulmonary alveolar microlithiasis
 Silicosis
 White Lung, a Canadian punk rock group